Ukrpovitroshliakh (Ukrainian Society of Airways, ''Ukrains'kyi povitrianyi shliakh'
) was an airline based in Kharkiv, Ukrainian SSR during the interbellum. It operated scheduled domestic (USSR) services. It was the first civil aviation company of Ukraine.

History
The airline was founded on 1 June 1923. Ukrpovitroshliach began operating on 15 April 1925, offering service from Kharkiv to Odesa and Kyiv. From 15 June 1925, the company also offered flights to Moscow and Rostov-on-Don, completing its network centered in Kharkiv.

In 1926, Konstantin Kalinin became a Chief Designer.

By 1928, Ukrpovitroshliach was carrying more than 3,000 passengers a year.  But the Soviet central government's "Five-Year Plan" called for all air service in the Soviet Union to be controlled by one government agency. In 1929, Ukrpovitroshliach was absorbed into the newly formed national airline Aeroflot along with the other Soviet operators -- Zakavia and Deruluft.

Fleet 	
 Dornier Komet
 Kalinin K-4

Accidents and incidents
12 September 1929
Dornier Merkur CCCP-211 crashed while returning to Sukhumi due to loss of control following engine problems, killing both pilots. The aircraft was being tested following repairs from a previous accident two months earlier at the same airport.

References

Bibliography

Defunct airlines of Ukraine
Airlines established in 1923
Airlines of the Soviet Union
Former Aeroflot divisions
Airlines disestablished in 1929
1923 establishments in Ukraine

Aviation history of Ukraine